Prithvi Singh II (1762 – 13 April 1778), also known as Prithviraj Singh II, was the Maharaja of Amer Kingdom (1768–1778). He was a son of Madho Singh I, Raja of Jaipur.

Biography

Prithvi Singh was 5 years old when he ascended the throne.  Being elder, Prithvi Singh succeeded his father on the throne and his mother became the regent.  One of his nobles, Pratap Singh Naruka separated himself from the State of Jaipur and established an independent kingdom at Machheri near Alwar.  That is how Alwar became a separate state independent of Jaipur.  Prithvi Singh ruled for 10 years and died in 1778 at the age of 15, leaving behind a widow of 11.

References 

People from Jaipur
1762 births
1778 deaths
18th-century Indian royalty